Rhizophysidae is a family of siphonophores in the suborder Cystonectae.  It includes Bathyphysa conifera, sometimes called the "flying spaghetti monster".

In Japanese, the family is called .

References

 
Cystonectae
Cnidarian families